Chrysi or Chrisi (also known as Gaidouronisi) is an uninhabited Greek island approximately  south of Crete close to Ierapetra in the Libyan Sea. Administratively these islands fall within the Ierapetra municipality in Lasithi.

It contains a small harbour and church, the Church of Saint Nicholas, on its northwestern coast.

Tourism

It is possible to visit Chrissi by sea from Ierapetra and from Myrtos. There is a nudist beach on the north coast of the island. On the western part of the island is the chapel of Saint Nicholas (estimated to date to the 13th century). There are also a salt pan, an old port, some Minoan ruins, a lighthouse and a Roman cemetery. Owing to the shallow waters around Chrissi, snorkelling and diving are popular pastimes. The Belegrina, Hatzivolakas, and Kataprosopo bays have a wide diversity of shells.

It is possible to reach the island from Ierapetra between middle of May and late October. During the summer months, excursion boats from Ierapetra leave the quay every morning and return in the afternoon.

Environmental protection
Chrissi is protected as an "area of intense natural beauty". The island has the largest naturally formed Juniperus macrocarpa forest in Europe. There is no fresh drinking water on the island. The density is approximately 28 trees per hectare (69.16/acre).

Archaeology

Archaeologists excavated a Minoan settlement dating to between 1800 and 1500 B.C. At the settlement they also found purple dye workshops and many artifacts.

See also

List of islands of Greece

References

External links 
 Chrissi Island (English, Italian, Greek and auto translation options)
 Ierapetra Community, Island Chrysi (Greek)
 Chrissi Island (English)

Landforms of Lasithi
Uninhabited islands of Crete
Mediterranean islands
Forests of Greece
National parks of Greece
Tourist attractions in Crete
Islands of Greece